Mourning is the expression of an experience that is the consequence of an event in life involving loss, causing  grief, occurring as a result of someone's death, specifically someone who was loved  although loss from death is not exclusively the cause of all experience of grief.

The word is used to describe a complex of behaviours in which the bereaved participate or are expected to participate, the expression of which varies by culture. Wearing black clothes is one practice followed in many countries, though other forms of dress are seen. Those most affected by the loss of a loved one often observe a period of mourning, marked by withdrawal from social events and quiet, respectful behavior. People may follow religious traditions for such occasions.
 
Mourning may apply to the death of, or anniversary of the death of, an important individual such as a local leader, monarch, religious figure, or member of family. State mourning may occur on such an occasion. In recent years, some traditions have given way to less strict practices, though many customs and traditions continue to be followed.

Stages of grief

Mourning is a personal and collective response which can vary depending on feelings and contexts. Elisabeth Kübler-Ross's theory of grief describes five separate periods of experience in the psychological and emotional processing of loss. These stages do not necessarily follow each other, and each period is not inevitable.

 : This short phase of mourning occurs when a person first discovers the loss, and refuses to believe it. This is a more or less intense period where emotions seem virtually absent. The affected person can faint and may even vomit without being conscious. After this short stage of mourning, the reality of loss sets in.
 : This phase is characterized by a sense of outrage due to the loss, accompanied by guilt in some cases. 
 : This phase sees a person engage in internal bargaining and negotiation.
 : The depression phase can be the longest phase of the mourning process, characterized by great sadness, questioning, and distress. Mourners in this phase sometimes feel that they will never complete their mourning. They have experienced a wide range of emotions and their sorrow is great.
 : The last stage of mourning, where the bereaved gets better. The reality of the loss is much more understood and accepted. The bereaved can still feel sadness, but has regained full functioning and has also reorganized life adjusting to the loss.

Grief can be defined as the period following the death of someone close. This is both psychological and social:

 : When someone close to a person dies, the person enters a period of sorrow and questioning, or even nervous breakdown. There are three stages in the grieving process, encompassing the denial, depression and acceptance phases of Kübler-Ross' five step model.
 : The feelings and mental state of the mourner affect their ability to maintain or enter into relationships with others, including professional, personal and sexual relationships. After the customs of burying or cremating the deceased, many cultures follow a number of socially-prescribed traditions that may affect the clothing a person wears and how long before or even if the mourner can remarry. These traditions are generally determined by the degree of kinship to and the social importance of the deceased.

Death can be a release for the mourner, in the case of the death of an abusive or tyrannical person, or when death terminates the long, painful illness of a loved one. However, this release may add remorse and guilt for the mourner.

Social customs and dress

Africa

Ethiopia
Members make monthly financial contributions forming the 's fund. They are entitled to receive a certain sum of money from this fund to help cover funeral and other expenses associated with deaths. Additionally,  members comfort the mourners: female members take turns doing housework, such as preparing food for the mourning family, while male members usually take the responsibility to arrange the funeral and erect a temporary tent to shelter guests who come to visit the mourning family.  members are required to stay with the mourning family and comfort them for three full days.

Asia

East Asia

White is the traditional color of mourning in Chinese culture, with white clothes and hats formerly having been associated with death. In imperial China, Confucian mourning obligations required even the emperor to retire from public affairs upon the death of a parent. The traditional period of mourning was nominally 3 years, but usually 25–27 lunar months in practice, and even shorter in the case of necessary officers; the emperor, for example, typically remained in seclusion for just 27 days.

Other colors, particularly reds and bright shades, are considered inappropriate for mourning dress. If wearing Western clothes, women may wear a single strand of white pearls. Japanese-style mourning dress for women consists of a five-crested plain black silk kimono, a black  and black accessories worn over white undergarments, black  and white . Men's mourning dress consists of clothing worn on extremely formal occasions: a plain black silk five-crested kimono and black and white, or gray and white, striped  trousers over white undergarments, a black crested  jacket with a white closure, white or black  and white . It is customary for Japanese-style mourning dress to be worn only by the immediate family and very close friends of the deceased; other attendees wear Western-style mourning dress or subdued Western or Japanese formal clothes.

Southeast Asia
In Thailand, people wear black when attending a funeral. Black is considered the mourning color, although historically it was white. Widows may wear purple when mourning the death of their spouse.

Filipino practices for mourning bear influence from Chinese, Japanese, and folk Catholic beliefs. The immediate family traditionally wear black, with white as a popular alternative. Other mourners may wear subdued colours when paying respects, with the color red universally considered taboo within 9–40 days of a death. It is believed that those who wear red, which is reserved for happier occasions, will die or suffer illness. The bereaved, should they wear other clothes, wear a small scrap of black ribbon or a black plastic pin on the left breast, which is disposed of after mourning. The consumption of chicken during the wake and funeral is believed to bring death to the bereaved, who are forbidden from seeing mourners off. The spirit of the dead is believed to roam the earth until the 40th day after death, when it is said to cross into the afterlife, echoing the 40 days between Christ's Resurrection and Ascension into Heaven.

West Asia
In the Assyrian tradition, just after a person passes away, the mourning family host guests in an open house style. Only bitter coffee and tea are served, showcasing the sorrowful state of the family. On the funeral day, a memorial mass is held in the church. At the graveyard, the people gather and burn incense around the grave as clergy chant hymns in the Syriac language. The closest female relatives traditionally bewail or lament in a public display of grief as the casket descends. A few others may sing a dirge or a sentimental threnody. During all these occasions, everyone is expected to dress completely in black. Following the burial, everyone returns to the church hall for afternoon lunch and eulogy. At the hall, the closest relatives sit on a long table facing the guests as many people walk by and offer their condolences. On the third day, mourners customarily visit the grave site with a pastor to burn incense, symbolising Jesus' triumph over death on the third day. This is also done 40 days after the funeral (representing Jesus ascending to heaven), and one year later to conclude the mourning period. Mourners wear only black until the 40 day mark and typically do not dance or celebrate any major events for one year.

Europe

Continental Europe

Through the Middle Ages and Renaissance, distinctive mourning was worn for general as well as personal loss; after the St. Bartholomew's Day Massacre of Huguenots in France, Elizabeth I of England and her court are said to have dressed in full mourning to receive the French Ambassador.

Widows and other women in mourning wore distinctive black caps and veils, generally in a conservative version of any current fashion.

In areas of Russia, the Czech Republic, Slovakia, Greece, Albania, Mexico, Portugal, and Spain, widows wear black for the rest of their lives. The immediate family members of the deceased wear black for an extended time. Since the 1870s, mourning practices for some cultures, even those who have emigrated to the United States, are to wear black for at least two years, though lifelong black for widows remains in some parts of Europe.

In Belgium, the Court went in public mourning after publication in the Moniteur Belge. In 1924, the court went in mourning after the death of Marie-Adélaïde, Grand Duchess of Luxembourg, for 10 days, the duke of Montpensier for five days, and a full month for the death of Princess Louise of Belgium.

White mourning

The color of deepest mourning among medieval European queens was white. In 1393, Parisians were treated to the unusual spectacle of a royal funeral carried out in white, for Leo V, King of Armenia, who died in exile. This royal tradition survived in Spain until the end of the 15th century. In 1934, Queen Wilhelmina of the Netherlands reintroduced white mourning after the death of her husband Prince Henry. It has since remained a tradition in the Dutch royal family.

In 2004, the four daughters of Queen Juliana of the Netherlands all wore white to their mother's funeral. In 1993, the Spanish-born Queen Fabiola introduced it in Belgium for the funeral of her husband, King Baudouin of Belgium. The custom for the Queens of France to wear  ("white mourning") was the origin of the White Wardrobe created in 1938 by Norman Hartnell for Queen Elizabeth (later known as the Queen Mother). She was required to make a State visit to France while in mourning for her mother.

United Kingdom
Today, no special dress or behaviour is obligatory for those in mourning in the general population of the United Kingdom, although ethnic groups and religious faiths have specific rituals, and black is typically worn at funerals. Traditionally, however, strict social rules were observed.

Georgian and Victorian eras

By the 19th century, mourning behaviour in England had developed into a complex set of rules, particularly among the upper classes. For women, the customs involved wearing heavy, concealing black clothing, and the use of heavy veils of black crêpe. The entire ensemble was colloquially known as "widow's weeds" (from the Old English , meaning "garment"), and would either be newly created clothing, or overdyed clothing the mourner already owned. Up until the later 18th century, the clothes of the deceased, unless they were considerably poor, were still listed in the inventories of the dead, as clothing constituted a relatively high expense.

Special caps and bonnets, usually in black or other dark colours, were worn with these ensembles; mourning jewellery, often made of jet, was also worn, and became highly popular in the Victorian era. Jewellery was also occasionally made from the hair of the deceased. The wealthy would wear cameos or lockets designed to hold a lock of the deceased's hair or some similar relic.

Widows were expected to wear special clothes to indicate that they were in mourning for up to four years after the death, although a widow could choose to wear such attire for a longer period of time, even for the rest of her life. To change one's clothing earlier than this was considered disrespectful to the deceased, and, if the widow was still young and attractive, suggestive of potential sexual promiscuity. Those subject to the rules were slowly allowed to re-introduce conventional clothing at specific times; such stages were known by such terms as "full mourning", "half mourning", and similar descriptions. For half mourning, muted colours such as lilac, grey and lavender could be introduced.

Friends, acquaintances, and employees wore mourning to a greater or lesser degree depending on their relationship to the deceased. Mourning was worn for six months after the death of a sibling. Parents would wear mourning for a child for "as long as they [felt] so disposed". A widow was supposed to wear mourning for two years, and was not supposed to enter society for 12 months. No lady or gentleman in mourning was supposed to attend social events while in deep mourning. In general, servants wore black armbands when there had been a death in the household. However, amongst polite company, the wearing of a simple black armband was seen as appropriate only for military men, or others compelled to wear uniform in the course of their duties—a black armband instead of proper mourning clothes was seen as a degradation of proper etiquette, and to be avoided. In general, men were expected to wear mourning suits (not to be confused with morning suits) of black frock coats with matching trousers and waistcoats. In the later interbellum period between World War I and World War II, as the frock coat became increasingly rare, the mourning suit consisted of a black morning coat with black trousers and waistcoat, essentially a black version of the morning suit worn to weddings and other occasions, which would normally include coloured waistcoats and striped or checked trousers.

Formal mourning culminated during the reign of Queen Victoria, whose long and conspicuous grief over the death of her husband, Prince Albert, heavily influenced society. Although fashion began to be more functional and less restrictive for the succeeding Edwardian era, appropriate dress for men and women—including that for the period of mourning—was still strictly prescribed and rigidly adhered to. In 2014, The Metropolitan Museum of Modern Art mounted an exhibition of women's mourning attire from the 19th century, entitled Death Becomes Her: A Century of Mourning Attire.

The customs were not universally supported, with Charles Voysey writing, "that it adds needlessly to the gloom and dejection of really afflicted relatives must be apparent to all who have ever taken part in these miserable rites."

The rules were gradually relaxed over time, and it became acceptable practice for both sexes to dress in dark colours for up to a year after a death in the family. By the late 20th century, this no longer applied, and black had been widely adopted by women in cities as a fashionable colour.

North America

United States

Mourning generally followed English forms into the 20th century. Black dress is still considered proper etiquette for attendance at funerals, but extended periods of wearing black dress are no longer expected. However, attendance at social functions such as weddings when a family is in deep mourning is frowned upon. Men who share their father's given name and use a suffix such as "Junior" retain the suffix at least until the father's funeral is complete.

In the antebellum South, with social mores that imitated those of England, mourning was just as strictly observed by the upper classes.

In the 19th century, mourning could be quite expensive, as it required a whole new set of clothes and accessories or, at the very least, overdyeing existing garments and taking them out of daily use. For a poorer family, this was a strain on resources.

At the end of The Wonderful Wizard of Oz, Dorothy explains to Glinda that she must return home because her aunt and uncle cannot afford to go into mourning for her because it was too expensive.

A late 20th and early 21st century North American mourning phenomenon is the rear window memorial decal. This is a large vinyl window-cling decal memorializing a deceased loved one, prominently displayed in the rear windows of cars and trucks belonging to close family members and sometimes friends. It often contains birth and death dates, although some contain sentimental phrases or designs as well.

The Pacific

Tonga

In Tonga, family members of deceased persons wear black for an extended time, with large plain Taʻovala. Often, black bunting is hung from homes and buildings. In the case of the death of royalty, the entire country adopts mourning dress and black and purple bunting is displayed from most buildings.

State and official mourning

States usually declare a period of 'official mourning' after the death of a head of state. in the case of a monarchy, court mourning refers to mourning during a set period following the death of a public figure or member of a royal family. The protocols for mourning vary, but typically include the lowering or posting half-mast of flags on public buildings. In contrast, the Royal Standard of the United Kingdom is not flown at half-mast upon the death of a head of state, as there is always a monarch on the throne.

The degree and duration of public mourning is generally decreed by a protocol officer. It was not unusual for the British court to declare that all citizens should wear full mourning for a specified period after the death of the monarch or that the members of the court should wear full- or half-mourning for an extended time. On the death of Queen Victoria (22 January 1901), the Canada Gazette published an "extra" edition announcing that court mourning would continue until 24 January 1902. It directed the public to wear deep mourning until 6 March 1901 and half-mourning until 17 April 1901. As they had done in earlier years for Queen Victoria, her son King Edward VII, his wife Queen Alexandra and the Queen Elizabeth The Queen Mother, the royal family went into mourning on the death of Prince Philip in April 2021. The black-and-white costumes designed by Cecil Beaton for the Royal Ascot sequence in My Fair Lady were inspired by the "Black Ascot" of 1910, when the court was in mourning for Edward VII.

The principle of continuity of the State, however, is also respected in mourning, and is reflected in the French saying  ("The king is dead, long live the king!"). Regardless of the formalities of mourning, the power of state is handed on, typically immediately if the succession is uncontested. A short interruption of work in the civil service, however, may result from one or more days of closing the offices, especially on the day of the state funeral.

In January 2006, on the death of Jaber Al-Ahmad Al-Jaber Al-Sabah, the emir of Kuwait, a mourning period of 40 days was declared. In Tonga, the official mourning lasts for a year; the heir is crowned after this period has passed.

Religions and customs

Confucianism

There are five grades of mourning obligations in the Confucian Code. A person is expected to honor most of those descended from their great-great-grandfather, and most of their wives. The death of a person's father and mother would merit 27 months of mourning; the death of a person's grandfather on the male side, as well as their grandfather's wife, would be grade two, or necessitate 12 months of mourning. A paternal uncle is grade three, at nine months, with grade four is reserved for one's father's first cousin, maternal grandparents, siblings and sister's children (five months). First cousins once removed, second cousins and the parents of a man's wife's are considered grade five (three months).

Buddhism

Christianity

Eastern Christianity

Orthodox Christians usually hold the funeral either the day after death or on the third day, and always during the daytime. In traditional Orthodox communities, the body of the departed would be washed and prepared for burial by family or friends, and then placed in the coffin in the home. A house in mourning would be recognizable by the lid of the coffin, with a cross on it, and often adorned with flowers, set on the porch by the front door.

Special prayers are held on the third, seventh or ninth (number varies in different national churches), and 40th days after death; the third, sixth and ninth or twelfth month; and annually thereafter in a memorial service, for up to three generations. Kolyva is ceremoniously used to honor the dead.

Sometimes men in mourning will not shave for the 40 days. In Greece and other Orthodox countries, it is not uncommon for widows to remain in mourning dress for the rest of their lives.

When an Orthodox bishop dies, a successor is not elected until after the 40 days of mourning are completed, during which period his diocese is said to be "widowed".

The 40th day has great significance in Orthodox religion, considered the period during which soul of deceased wanders on earth. On the 40th day, the ascension of the deceased's soul occurs, and is the most important day in mourning period, when special prayers are held on the grave site of deceased.

As in the Roman Catholic rites, there can be symbolic mourning. During Holy Week, some temples in the Church of Cyprus draw black curtains across the icons. The services of Good Friday and Holy Saturday morning are patterned in part on the Orthodox Christian burial service, and funeral lamentations.

Western Christianity

The European social forms are, in general, forms of Christian religious expression transferred to the greater community.

In the Roman Catholic Church, the Mass of Paul VI, adopted in 1969, allows several options for the liturgical color used in Masses for the Dead. Before the liturgical reform, black was the ordinary color for funeral Masses; in the revised use, several options are available, though black is the norm. According to the General Instruction of the Roman Missal (§346d-e), black vestments is to be worn at Offices and Masses for the dead; an indult was given for several countries to use violet or white vestments, and in some of those nations those colours have largely supplanted the use of black vestments.

Christian churches often go into mourning symbolically during the period of Lent to commemorate the sacrifice and death of Jesus. Customs vary among the denominations and include the covering or removal of statuary, icons and paintings, and use of special liturgical colors, such as violet/purple, during Lent and Holy Week.

In more formal congregations, parishioners also dress according to specific forms during Holy Week, particularly on Maundy Thursday and Good Friday, when it is common to wear black or sombre dress or the liturgical color purple.

Special prayers are held on the third, seventh, and 30th days after death;

Prayers are held on the third day, because Jesus rose again after three days in the sepulchre (1 Corinthians 15:4).

Prayers are held on the seventh day, because Joseph mourned his father Jacob seven days (Genesis 50:10) and in Book of Sirach is written that "seven days the dead are mourned" (Ecclesiasticus 22:13).

Prayers are held on the thirtieth day, because Aaron (Numbers 20:30) and Moses (Deuteronomy 34:8) were mourned thirty days.

Hinduism
Death is not seen as the final "end" in Hinduism, but is seen as a turning point in the seemingly endless journey of the indestructible "atman", or soul, through innumerable bodies of animals and people. Hence, Hinduism prohibits excessive mourning or lamentation upon death, as this can hinder the passage of the departed soul towards its journey ahead: "As mourners will not help the dead in this world, therefore (the relatives) should not weep, but perform the obsequies to the best of their power."

Hindu mourning is described in dharma shastras. It begins immediately after the cremation of the body and ends on the morning of the thirteenth day. Traditionally, the body is cremated within 24 hours after death; however, cremations are not held after sunset or before sunrise. Immediately after the death, an oil lamp is lit near the deceased, and this lamp is kept burning for three days.

Hinduism associates death with ritual impurity for the immediate blood family of the deceased, hence during these mourning days, the immediate family must not perform any religious ceremonies (except funerals), must not visit temples or other sacred places, must not serve the sages (holy men), must not give alms, must not read or recite from the sacred scriptures, nor can they attend social functions such as marriages and parties. The family of the deceased is not expected to serve any visiting guests food or drink. It is customary that the visiting guests do not eat or drink in the house where the death has occurred. The family in mourning are required to bathe twice a day, eat a single simple vegetarian meal, and try to cope with their loss.

On the day on which the death has occurred, the family do not cook; hence usually close family and friends will provide food for the mourning family. White clothing (the color of purity) is the color of mourning, and many will wear white during the mourning period.

The male members of the family do not cut their hair or shave, and the female members of the family do not wash their hair until the 10th day after the death. If the deceased was young and unmarried, the "Narayan Bali" is performed by the Pandits. The Mantras of "Bhairon Paath" are recited. This ritual is performed through the person who has given the Mukhagni (Ritual of giving fire to the dead body).

On the morning of the 13th day, a Śrāddha ceremony is performed. The main ceremony involves a fire sacrifice, in which offerings are given to the ancestors and to gods, to ensure the deceased has a peaceful afterlife. Pind Sammelan is performed to ensure the involvement of the departed soul with that of God. Typically after the ceremony, the family cleans and washes all the idols in the family shrine; and flowers, fruits, water and purified food are offered to the gods. Then, the family is ready to break the period of mourning and return to daily life.

Islam

In Shi'a Islam, examples of mourning practices are held annually in the month of Muharram, the first month of Islamic Lunar calendar. This mourning is held in the commemoration of Imam Al Husayn ibn Ali, who was martyred along with his 72 companions by Yazid bin Muawiyah. Shi'a Muslims wear black clothes and take out processions on road to mourn on the tragedy of Karbala. Shi'a Muslims also mourn the death of Fatima (the only daughter of Muhammad) and the Shi'a Imams.

Mourning is observed in Islam by increased devotion, receiving visitors and condolences, and avoiding decorative clothing and jewelry. Loved ones and relatives are to observe a three-day mourning period. Widows observe an extended mourning period (Iddah), four months and ten days long, in accordance with the Qur'an 2:234. During this time, she is not to remarry, move from her home, or wear decorative clothing or jewelry.

Grief at the death of a beloved person is normal, and weeping for the dead is allowed in Islam. What is prohibited is to express grief by wailing ("bewailing" refers to mourning in a loud voice), shrieking, tearing hair or clothes, breaking things, scratching faces, or uttering phrases that make a Muslim lose faith.

Directives for widows
The Qur'an prohibits widows from engaging themselves for four lunar months and ten days after the death of their husbands. According to Qur'an:

Islamic scholars consider this directive a balance between mourning a husband's death and protection of the widow from censure that she became interested in remarrying too soon after her husband's death. This is also to ascertain whether or not she is pregnant.

Judaism

Judaism looks upon mourning as a process by which the stricken can re-enter into society, and so provides a series of customs that make this process gradual. The period of mourning after the death of a parent lasts one year. Each stage places lighter demands and restrictions than the previous one in order to reintegrate the bereaved into normal life.

In the West, typically, mirrors are covered and a small tear is made in an item of clothing to indicate a lack of interest in personal vanity. The bereaved dress simply and sit on the floor, short stools or boxes rather than chairs when receiving the condolences of visitors. In some cases relatives or friends take care of the bereaved's house chores, as cooking and cleaning. English speakers use the expression "to sit shiva".

However, some customs still apply. There is a prohibition on getting married or attending any sort of celebrations and men refrain from shaving or cutting their hair.

Restrictions during the year of mourning include not wearing new clothes, not listening to music and not attending celebrations. In addition, the sons of the deceased recite the Kaddish prayer for the first eleven months of the year during prayer services where there is a quorum of 10 men. The Kaddish prayer is then recited annually on the date of death, usually called the yahrzeit. The date is according to the Hebrew calendar. In addition to saying the Kaddish in the synagogue, a 24-hour memorial candle is lit in the home of the person saying the Kaddish.

See also

 Burial
 Cemetery
 Cremation
 Death wail
 Half-mast
 Month's Mind
 Mourning portraits
 Mourning ring
 Mourning sickness
 Requiem
 Rudaali (Indian film)
 Victorian fashion
 Wake (ceremony)
 Widow's cap

References

Citations

Bibliography
 The Canada Gazette
 Clothing of Ancient Rome
 Charles Spencer, Cecil Beaton: Stage and Film Designs, London: Academy Editions, 1975. (no ISBN)
 Karen Rae Mehaffey, The After-Life: Mourning Rituals and the Mid-Victorians, Lasar Writers Publishing, 1993. (no ISBN)

External links

 The Jewish Way in Death and Mourning By Maurice Lamm
 To Those Who Mourn a Christian view by Max Heindel

Funerals
History of clothing